The Ming Xia (明夏), 1363–1371, officially the Great Xia, was a short-lived Chinese dynasty in modern Sichuan and Chongqing during the chaotic late Yuan dynasty. It was founded by the Red Turban rebel general Ming Yuzhen whose army expelled Yuan loyalists from the region in the late 1350s. 

In 1363 Ming declared himself Emperor of Great Xia, with the capital in Chongqing. He tried to conquer Yunnan from the warlord Basalawarmi but failed. After his death in 1366, his teenage son Ming Sheng succeeded him, but the empire began to disintegrate into regional military commands. In 1371, the Ming dynasty under emperor Zhu Yuanzhang made a two-pronged attack and conquered Ming Xia relatively easily. Ming Sheng surrendered and was exiled to Goryeo by Zhu. Ming Sheng then became the progenitor of the Korean Namwon Seung clan, Yeonan Myeong clan and Seochok Myeong clan.

References 
  Die Xia-Dynastie in Sichuan (1362-1371)

Former countries in Chinese history
History of Sichuan
Transition from Yuan to Ming